Arahanthgiri Jain Math is a Jain Matha that established near Tirumalai in August, 1998. The Math is headed by Bhattaraka Dhavalakeerthi.

History
History of Arahanthgiri Jain Math starts from the period of 322–185 BCE as the Last ‘Shrutkevali’ Bhadrabahu expected to stay at this place. He stayed at this place to practice meditation and “Swadhyaya” along with 8000 other saints. The Village Thirumalai where this Jain Math is located is also known as Arhatsugiri or Arihantgiri.
This more than 2,000 years old temple is near Tirumala. The complex is now managed by Archaeological Survey of India.

Main Temple
We can find the 16-meter Neminath Idol on the top of the hill having 140 steps at this location. This idol is believed to be dated as old as 12th century. A very famous south Indian movie has been shot around the theme of Neminatha. We can see various ancient caves existing in this Jain Math along with 16 meter idol of Neminath and hundreds of Religious books.

See also

Tirumalai (Jain complex)
Tamil Jain
Bhattaraka Dhavalakeerthi
List of Jain temples
Laxmisena
Mel Sithamur Jain Math

References

External links
Photographs of Tirumalai taken 2011-06-01.

Jain temples in Tamil Nadu
Tiruvannamalai district
4th-century BC Jain temples